The Brighouse and Rastrick Brass Band is a British brass band formed in 1881. The band is based in Brighouse, in Calderdale, West Yorkshire, England. The band is known across the world, and is regarded by many as the best and most consistent "public subscription band" in the world.

History
Throughout its history, the majority of premier band championships have been held by "Briggus", whilst the band has also attracted a formidable reputation for highly entertaining concerts for both the general public and brass band connoisseur.

The band was formed over 125 years ago through public donations given by the townsfolk of the adjacent villages of Brighouse and Rastrick that face each other across the River Calder in West Yorkshire, England.

Today, it still continues to be supported through public subscriptions and its own fund raising efforts. Its amateur members traditionally pride themselves on being financially independent, never having been beholden to any commercial interest, yet they are still regarded as one of the "elite" on the contest and concert platforms.

Since January 1995, the band has practised at their purpose-built hall and music library called West Ridings at Brighouse High School on Finkil Street in the north of Brighouse.

In 2009 (when conducted by Richard Evans), Brighouse and Rastrick achieved "Most Entertaining Band" at Brass in Concert. In 2010 (when conducted by Professor David King) they won the Regional Championship in Yorkshire, regarded as the strongest region for banding in the world and the National Championships of Great Britain, a competition held at London's Royal Albert Hall, a feat replicated the following year, the Yorkshire Championship title in 2011 and the National Championship title. Along with the contest successes, followers of brass band website 4barsrest.com voted Brighouse & Rastrick and conductor David King "Band of the Year 2011" and "Conductor of the Year 2011" respectively.

In 2012, the band were therefore aiming for a hat trick of wins at both events, only to be pipped to second place at each. With another second placing in Yorkshire and a fourth placing at the National Finals in 2013, it has taken until 2014 for B&R to reclaim the Yorkshire title under the leadership of David King. The band's principal cornet players Stuart Lingard was awarded the "Best Principal Cornet" for his contribution.

Since then, the band has had major successes across a number of contests, and has proven itself to be one of the finest brass bands in the world; while also maintaining a busy schedule of high profile performances across the UK and across the globe.

"The Floral Dance"

In November 1977, the band reached number 2 in the UK Singles Chart with their recording of "The Floral Dance", where they stayed for six weeks, only surpassed at the time by "Mull of Kintyre" (the first UK single to sell more than two million copies, and third best selling UK single of all time). It was arranged for the band by Derek Broadbent. The B-side was a version of "Girl with the Flaxen Hair", although some copies had a composition by Broadbent entitled "Bachelor Girls" as its B-side. The single also reached Number 37 on the Australian charts. The corresponding album, The Floral Dance, reached Number 10 in the UK Albums Chart. In 2016, the band performed the number on BBC One's The One Show special Terry Wogan tribute episode.

The Unthanks
The band toured the UK with The Unthanks in 2011, including a live performance at the BBC Radio 2 Folk Awards and an appearance at the Cambridge Folk Festival. In 2012, a live album, The Unthanks with Brighouse and Rastrick Brass Band, was released: it received  a four-starred review from Robin Denselow in The Guardian.

Honours

 2022 British Open Brass Band Champions
 Yorkshire Regional Champions: Winners 2010, 2011, 2014, 2019
 National Brass Band Championships of Great Britain: Winners 2010, 2011, 2017

Players 
Principal Cornet

Tom Smith

Assistant Principal Cornet

Bethan Plant

Solo Cornets

Ginette Nurney
Nick Hamlett

Soprano Cornet

Martin Irwin

Repiano Cornet

Alicia David

Second Cornets

Samuel Gibson
Hayley Moore

Third Cornets

Natalie Morrison
Ian Broadbent

Flugel Horn

Mike Eccles

Solo Horn

Andy Moore

First Horn

Trevor McCormick

Second Horn

Ian Dust

Solo Baritone

Amy Ewen

Second Baritone

Steve Cavanagh

Solo Trombone

Ellena Newton

Second Trombone

Charlotte Horsfield

Bass Trombone

Steve Lomas

Solo Euphonium

Chris Robertson

Second Euphonium

Daniel Thomas

Eb Basses

Dave Hebb
Will Evans

Bb Basses

Chris Hardy
James Brooks

Percussion

Tom Hall
Jon Kenna
Simon Oliver
Ross Alexander

See also
 Furry Dance
 List of one-hit wonders on the UK Singles Chart

References

External links
 The Amazing Story of "The Floral Dance"
 Official website: Brighouse and Rastrick Brass Band

Audio clips
 The Floral Dance
 Recorded in Edmonton, Alberta in 2005 at the Francis Winspear Centre for Music
 Whiter Shade of Pale
 Deck the Halls
 Live and Let Die
 Entrance of the Gladiators by Julius Fučík

Video clips
 The Floral Dance on Top of the Pops

1881 establishments in England
British brass bands
Musical groups from West Yorkshire
Musical groups established in 1881
People from Brighouse
Transatlantic Records artists